The dinosaur nudibranch (Melibe liltvedi) is a species of dendronotid nudibranch, and is only found in South Africa. It is a marine gastropod mollusc in the family Tethydidae.

Distribution
This species is endemic to the South African coast and has only been found on the Atlantic coast of the Cape Peninsula in 10 to 20 m.

Description
The dinosaur nudibranch is a white nudibranch distinguished by its large extendable hood. Puffy paired cerata extend down the notum and there is a projection of unknown function behind the rhinophore sheath.

Ecology
The dinosaur nudibranch feeds on small crustaceans, capturing them with its oral hood.

References

Tethydidae
Gastropods described in 1987